Axel May (born 13 August 1948 is a sailor from the West-Germany, who represented his country at three Olympic Games. The first time was the 1968 Summer Olympics in Acapulco, Mexico as crew member in the 5.5 Metre. With helmsman Klaus Oldendorff and fellow crew member Peter Stülcken they took the 7th place. The second appearance was the 1976 Summer Olympics in Kingston, Ontario, Canada as crew member in the Soling. With helmsman Willi Kuhweide and fellow crew member Karsten Meyer they took the 5th place. His final Olympics were the 1984 Summer Olympics in Los Angeles, United States as crew member in the Soling. With helmsman Willi Kuhweide and fellow crew member Eckard Löll they took the 8th place.

References

Sources
 

Living people
1948 births
Olympic sailors of West Germany
German male sailors (sport)
Sportspeople from Hamburg
Sailors at the 1968 Summer Olympics – Dragon
Sailors at the 1976 Summer Olympics – Soling
Sailors at the 1984 Summer Olympics – Soling
European Champions Soling